Bezimenne is a village in Bashtanka Raion (district) in Mykolaiv Oblast of southern Ukraine, at about  east-northeast (ENE) of the centre of Mykolaiv city. It belongs to Snihurivka urban hromada, one of the hromadas of Ukraine.

The village came under attack by Russian forces in 2022, during the Russian invasion of Ukraine,  and was regained by Ukrainian forces by the end of October the same year.

References

Villages in Bashtanka Raion